Ayşenil Şamlıoğlu (born 20 March 1956) is a Turkish actress, theatre director and author.

In 1974, she enrolled in the Istanbul University School of Journalism and Public Relations, but left the university and moved to Germany to take foreign language lessons in Frankfurt. Şamlıoğlu soon became interested in theatre and participated in works with amateur theatre groups. Upon returning to Turkey, Şamlıoğlu became enrolled in METU School of Architecture but left the school for the second time to join Anadolu Agency. After working there for a year, she joined a commercial agency as a drawer. She eventually graduated from Hacettepe University Ankara State Conservatory with a degree in theatre studies and in 1982 began working for Adana State Theatre as an actress and director.

Between 1988 and 1989, she gave theatre lessons at Hacettepe University and for a while worked as the general secretary for state theatre. Şamlıoğlu also authored Kaçıklık Diploması, which was adapted into a movie by Tunç Başaran. Her breakthrough came with her roles in the series Ferhunde Hanımlar and Bizim Evin Halleri. Her role in Yol Arkadaşım as "Hafize" made her widely known in Turkey. Alongside her career as an actress, she has worked in Istanbul City Theatres and Semaver Company as both a director and actress. In May 2009, Şamlıoğlu was appointed as the general art director for Istanbul City Theatres.

She is the daughter of the former President of the Court of Accounts Servet Şamlıoğlu (1926–1991). She also served as a judge at the 17th Afife Theatre Awards.

Theatre

As director 
 Kozalar : Adalet Ağaoğlu - Pangar - 2016
 Dil Kuşu : Pelin Temur - Destar Theatre - 2015
 Bana Mastikayı Çalsana : Nilbanu Engindeniz - Aysa Production Theatre - 2007
 Dünyanın Ortasında Bir Yer : Özen Yula - Istanbul State Theatre - 2007
 The Condemned of Altona : Jean-Paul Sartre - Ankara State Theatre - 2006
 Süleyman ve Öbürsüler : Max Frisch \ Yavuz Pekman - Semaver Company - 2005
 Gayri Resmi Hürrem : Özen Yula - Istanbul City Theatres - 2004
 Külhan Beyi Operası : Ülkü Ayvaz - Antalya State Theatre - 2002
 Bina : Behiç Ak - Sivas State Theatre - 2001 
 The Good Soldier Švejk : Bertolt Brecht - Antalya State Theatre - 2001
 The Wasps : Aristophanes - Ankara State Theatre - 2000
 Pazartesi Perşembe : Musahipzade Celal - Adana State Theatre - 1999
 Frank V : Friedrich Dürrenmatt - Adana State Theatre - 1998
 Kozalar : Adalet Ağaoğlu - Istanbul State Theatre - 1997
 Ölüler Konuşmak İster : Melih Cevdet Anday - Istanbul State Theatre - 1997
 Ich Feuerbach : Tankred Dorst - Ankara State Theatre - 1995

As actress 
 Öldün, Duydun mu? : Yiğit Sertdemir - Altıdan Sonra Theatre - 2013
 Evaristo : Civan Canova - Altıdan Sonra Theatre - 2013
 Geyikler Lanetler : Murathan Mungan - Ankara State Theatre
 Gılgameş : Zeynep Avcı - Ankara State Theatre - 1996
 Hüzün Coşkusu Altındağ : Yaşar Seymen\Adem Atar - Ankara State Theatre - 1992
 Deli Dumrul : Güngör Dilmen - Ankara State Theatre - 1990
 Aşkımız Aksaray!ın En Büyük Yangını : Güngör Dilmen - Ankara State Theatre - 1989
 Afife Jale : Nezihe Araz -  Ankara State Theatre - 1987
 Detective Story : Sidney Kingsley - Ankara State Theatre - 1985

Filmography

Film 
 İşe Yarar Bir Şey : Pelin Esmer - 2017 Gülistan
 Sen Aydınlatırsın Geceyi : Onur Ünlü - 2013 Şevket
 Eyyvah Eyvah 3 : Hakan Algül - 2013 Necla
 Eyyvah Eyvah 2 : Hakan Algül - 2010 Necla
 Prensesin Uykusu : Çağan Irmak - 2010
 Ay Lav Yu  : Sermiyan Midyat - 2009
 Meleğin Sırları : Aclan Büyüktürkoğlu - 2008 
 Sınav : Ömer Faruk Sorak - 2006 
 İnşaat : Ömer Vargı - 2003 
 O da Beni Seviyor : Barış Pirhasan - 2001 
 Kaçıklık Diploması : Tunç Başaran - 1998

Television 
 Gül Masalı (2022) - Fatma
 Yargı (2021–2022) - Şahver
 Bunu Bi' Düsünün (2021) - Münevver
 Menajerimi Ara (2020–2021) - Peride Sener
 Hizmetçiler (2020) - Nimet Atahanli
 Jet Sosyete (2018–2020) - Zahide Özpamuk
 Tatlı İntikam (2016) - Meliha Yılmaz
 Kocamın Ailesi (2014)
 Medcezir (2014)
 Bebek İşi (2013) 
 Galip Derviş(2013)
 Aldırma Gönül (2013)
 Kötü Yol (2012)
 Bizim Yenge (2011)
 Sen de Gitme (2011)
 Çakıl Taşları (2010)
 Yol Arkadaşım (2008)
 Fikrimin İnce Gülü (2007)
 Kabuslar Evi (2006)
 İlk Aşkım (2006)
 Taşların Sırrı (2006)
 Doktorlar (2006)
 Nefes Nefese (2005)
 Avrupa Yakası (2004)
 Bizim Evin Halleri (2000)
 Ferhunde Hanımlar (1993)

Awards 
 1988, The Art Society's Best Supporting Actress award (Afife Jale)
 1997, The Art Society's Director of the Year award (Pierre Ray)
 1998, İsmet Küntay Best Director award (Kozalar)
 1998, İsmet Küntay Best Director award (Ölüler Konuşmak İster)
 2000, İsmet Küntay Best Director award (Pazartesi Perşembe)
 2000, Çırağan Lions Club - Türkan Kahramankaptan Best Production award (Pazartesi Perşembe)
 2000, The Art Society's Best Production award (Pazartesi Perşembe)
 2000, The Critics Association Best Director award (Pazartesi Perşembe)
 2000, Afife Most Successful Director award (Gayrı Resmi Hürrem)

References

External links 
 
 

1956 births
Turkish theatre directors
Turkish stage actresses
Turkish film actresses
Turkish television actresses
Actresses from Istanbul
Living people